Rabbi Ḥaim Pinto (1748–1845) was the leading rabbi in the seaport city of Essaouira, Morocco, known in his lifetime as Mogador, Morocco.  Rabbi Pinto, himself born into a distinguished rabbinic family, had four sons, Rabbi Yehouda also known as Rabbi Haddan, Rabbi Yossef, Rabbi Yehoshiya and Rabbi Yaacov.

Annually, on the anniversary of Rabbi Pinto's death, (26 Elloul 5605, in the Hebrew calendar) Jews from around the world come on pilgrimage to pray at the rabbi's grave in the old jewish cemetery of Essaouira.

Rabbi Pinto is remembered as a man whose prayers were received in heaven in such a way that miracles resulted.

The Chaim Pinto Synagogue, the building that was Rabbi Pinto's home, office and synagogue is preserved as an historic site.

Rabbi Pinto's followers and descendants have a number of synagogues worldwide, including the Pinto Center synagogue on Pico Boulevard in Los Angeles, California, which was founded by Rabbi Yaacov Pinto.

Contemporary descendants include Rabbi Yishayahu Yosef Pinto.

References

1748 births
1845 deaths
Sephardi rabbis
18th-century Moroccan rabbis
19th-century Moroccan rabbis
People from Essaouira